Magix Music Maker is a commercial digital audio workstation (DAW) designed by the company Magix for the consumer sector. The program's attributes originate from Samplitude, Magix's professional digital audio workstation. The first version of Music Maker was published in 1994. With more than a million copies sold, Music Maker has become one of Europe’s most successful music editing programs.

A CD version for PlayStation 2 was released in 2003, followed by a Deluxe Edition on DVD in 2005. In 2013, Music Maker Jam was released in the Microsoft Store. A version for Android was released later that year.

Features
Music Maker is designed to allow users with little experience in music production to make songs in various genres. The Premium version allows users to export digital music in surround sound formats.

 Sound pool
 Sound import (digital music files, real instruments or vocals)
 Mixer, MIDI editor, synthesizer
 Sound processing plug-ins (equalization, dynamic compression, reverb, delay, chorus, flanger, distortion, limiting, vocoder)
VST Virtual instruments (high-quality midi guitars, basses, drums, pianos, and more).
 64 tracks to unlimited, depended on version.

Supported file formats and interfaces

Minimum system requirements

PC 

Processor with 2 GHz, or higher
 2 GB RAM
Hard disk drive with 700 MB free space
Graphics card with 1280x768 minimum resolution at 16-bit color
 16-bit sound card

Mobile 

 Android 4.0 or higher

References

External links
Official website

Audio editors
Digital audio workstation software
Magix software
Music looping
Multimedia software
Windows multimedia software